The 2019 Iowa State Cyclones football team represented Iowa State University in the 2019 NCAA Division I FBS football season. The Cyclones competed as members of the Big 12 Conference and were led by fourth-year head coach Matt Campbell. They played their home games at Jack Trice Stadium in Ames, Iowa.

Preseason

Coaching changes
In January 2019, head coach Matt Campbell announced that Tom Manning would return as offensive coordinator. He had served in that role for the Cyclones in Campbell's first two years in 2016 and 2017, but worked as the tight ends coach for the Indianapolis Colts during the 2018 season. Campbell also announced the addition of former West Virginia defensive backs coach Matt Caponi as a defensive assistant.

Big 12 media poll
The 2019 Big 12 media days were held July 15–16, 2019 in Frisco, Texas. In the Big 12 preseason media poll, Iowa State was predicted to finish in third in the standings.

Preseason All-Big 12 teams
To be released

Schedule
Iowa State's 2019 schedule will begin with three non-conference home games against Northern Iowa of the Missouri Valley Conference, Iowa of the Big Ten Conference, and Louisiana–Monroe of the Sun Belt Conference. In Big 12 Conference play, the Cyclones will play four home games against TCU, Oklahoma State, Texas, and Kansas; and will play five road games against Baylor, West Virginia, Texas Tech, Oklahoma, and Kansas State.

Source:

Personnel

Coaching staff
Staff for the 2019 season.

Rankings

Game summaries

Northern Iowa

Referee Scott Campbell

Iowa

Louisiana–Monroe

at Baylor

TCU

at West Virginia

at Texas Tech

Oklahoma State

at Oklahoma

Both Iowa State and Oklahoma lost their previous games.  Oklahoma could still be in the playoff chase by winning the remainder of their games and winning the Big 12 conference championship game.  Predictions call that the Oklahoma Defense will need to slow the Cyclone offense to win the game.  Coming into the game, it is listed as one of the most "compelling matchups" for the week by MSN Sports.

Texas

Kansas

at Kansas State

Game conditions were cold and windy for the 2019 edition of "Farmageddon".  Iowa State entered the game as the least-penalized team in the Big 12 Conference, but were charged with 8 penalties to Kansas State's 2 when two programs met in Manhattan.  The Cyclones also struggled on third down, only converting 1 attempt at 13.

Kansas State's Joshua Youngblood returned a kick for a touchdown on the first play of the game.  That placed him at the top of the NCAA for three touchdown returns in the season this year.

During the third quarter, each team managed a field goal but very little more happened offensively.  In the fourth quarter, Kansas State managed to pull ahead 24-17 with an eight-play drive rushing drive ending in a touchdown with 10:24 left in the game.  After that, Iowa State punter Joe Rivera kicked just 17 yards on fourth down, which Kansas State was able to turn in to a field goal and put the score out of reach for the Cyclones.  The final score was Kansas State 27, Iowa State 17.

After the game and 7-5 regular season record, CBS Sports bowl expert Jerry Palm projected that Iowa State will play Kentucky in the 2019 Liberty Bowl.

vs. Notre Dame (Camping World Bowl)

TV ratings

All totals via Sports Media Watch. Streaming numbers not included. † - Data not available.

References

Iowa State
Iowa State Cyclones football seasons
Iowa State Cyclones football